Raymond Charles Campi (April 20, 1934 – March 11, 2021) was an American singer and musician, nicknamed "The King of Rockabilly". He first recorded in the mid-1950s. Campi's trademark was his white double bass, which he often jumped on top of and "rode" while playing.

Biography
He was born in New York City, in April 1934, and lived in Yonkers, New York, during his earliest years. After his family moved in 1944 to Austin, Texas, Campi began a lifetime of performing and recording music in numerous genres, including folk, country, and rock and roll as well as rockabilly. Early on he recorded on Domino Records. In the 1950s, Campi recorded for several labels, including Dot Records, and recorded the first tribute record to the 1959 Buddy Holly plane crash,  "The Ballad of Donna and Peggy Sue", backed by the Big Bopper's band. He also worked with a diverse range of singers, including Mae West (who recorded his song "Caterpillar") and Ian Whitcomb.

He rarely concentrated on his musical career exclusively, working a wide variety of jobs, notably twenty-five years, from 1967, spent as a junior high school teacher in Van Nuys, California. During these years Ray Campi were a teacher for Johnny and Dorsey Burnette kids. He fiercely criticized the mainstream music industry, in particular its connections with drug culture.

His musical career took off in the early 1970s when he was rediscovered by Ronny Weiser, the owner of Rollin' Rock Records. Soon after, Ronny bought the double bass for him. But during the fifties, Ray Campi played on bass-guitar. After 4 days of practise, Ray recorded "Pan American Boogie" in Ronny's bedroom.  

Soon after Ray began touring Great Britain and Europe more often and regularly played at  festivals there. He also recorded with German, Finnish, British and Dutch rockabilly bands over two decades, and produced his own albums with artists such as Rosie Flores, Bobby 'Fats' Mizell and Ian Whitcomb.  Campi performed on several solo albums by Kevin Fennell, his lead guitarist from 1977 to 2015. Campi also performed and recorded with his longtime musical associate Rip Masters. 

Campi died in his sleep at home on March 11, 2021, at the age of 86.

Recognition 
Ray Campi was a member of the Rockabilly Hall of Fame.

Early discography 
Many of Ray Campi's earliest 1950s recordings were not issued until the 1980s and 1990s, mostly on European albums. But the following were issued on 45-rpm and, in some cases, 78-rpm. "Caterpillar" was considered his most popular record until his revival in the 1970s.
TNT 145 "Caterpillar"/"Play It Cool" 1956
Dot 15617 "It Ain't Me"/"Give That Love to Me" 1957
Domino 700 "My Screamin' Screamin' Mimi"/"Uh Huh Huh" 1958
Domino 701 "You Gambled"/"No Time" 1958
D-104 "Ballad of Donna and Peggy Sue"/"The Man I Met (Tribute to the Big Bopper)" 1959
Verve 10208 "Our Man in Havana"/"Reprieve of Love" 1960
Colpix 166 "Cry For Happy"/"Hear What I Wanna Hear" 1960

References

External links
 
 
 
 Entries at 45cat.com

1934 births
2021 deaths
21st-century American male musicians
21st-century double-bassists
American double-bassists
American rockabilly musicians
Country musicians from New York (state)
D Records artists
Male double-bassists
People from Yonkers, New York
Radar Records artists
Slap bassists (double bass)